The Folly Boat is a boat that washed up alongside Folly Road in Folly Beach, South Carolina during Hurricane Hugo in 1989. After nobody claimed the boat, passers-by began painting messages and pictures on the boat. It became an unofficial symbol of Folly Beach.

On September 11th, 2017, flooding from Hurricane Irma again moved Folly Boat, depositing it next to a privately owned dock on Sol Legare Road.

See also
Participatory art

External links
Folly Boat gallery and blog
FollyBeach.com article
2017 update

Buildings and structures in Charleston, South Carolina
Landmarks in South Carolina
Public art